Ivesia baileyi is a species of flowering plant in the rose family known by the common name Bailey's ivesia.

It is native to the Modoc Plateau of northeastern California and adjacent sections of Oregon, Nevada, and Idaho, as well as the northern slopes of the Sierra Nevada. It grows in volcanic rocky habitat, often growing from crevices in sheer rock faces.

Description
Ivesia baileyi  is a perennial herb forming clumps of green foliage, sometimes hanging from crevices where it has rooted. The leaves are up to 10 centimeters long and made up of several pairs of toothed leaflets.

The inflorescence is an open cyme of several tiny flowers with white, cream, or yellowish petals about 2 millimeters long.

External links
Jepson Manual Treatment

baileyi
Flora of California
Flora of Idaho
Flora of Nevada
Flora of Oregon
Flora of the Great Basin
Flora of the Sierra Nevada (United States)
~
Flora without expected TNC conservation status